Birkenhead War Memorial, or Birkenhead Cenotaph, stands in Hamilton Square, Birkenhead, Merseyside, England, opposite the Town Hall.  It consists of a cenotaph in Portland stone with carved figures and panels in Westmorland stone.  The memorial was designed by Lionel Budden, and the sculptor was H. Tyson Smith.  It was unveiled in 1925 by Lieutenant-General Sir Richard H. K. Butler.  The memorial is recorded in the National Heritage List for England as a designated Grade II* listed building.

History

In 1922 Birkenhead's War Memorial Executive Committee organised a competition to design a war memorial for the town.  There were 21 designs submitted and they were exhibited in the Birkenhead Art Gallery and Museum in February 1923.  Of these, 20 were in the Classical style used by Edwin Lutyens for The Cenotaph in Whitehall, London.  The designs were reviewed by Charles Reilly, the Professor at the Liverpool School of Architecture.  Among the designs of which he approved was that of Lionel Budden, one of his former students, who was then a senior lecturer at the School of Architecture.  The assessor for the competition was Major Gilbert Fraser, President of the Liverpool Architectural Society.  He selected Budden's design, and this was approved by the committee.  Budden appointed H. Tyson Smith as sculptor for the figures on the memorial, which was made by Joseph Davies of Birkenhead and H. A. Clegg and Sons of Chester.

Initially it had been planned for the memorial to stand on the north side of Hamilton Square, which was vacant.  However there was strong opinion that it should be on the east side of the square, opposite the Town Hall.  This site was occupied by the Statue of John Laird, but it was agreed that the Laird statue should be moved to the west side of the square, and be replaced by the war memorial.  The memorial was unveiled on 1 July 1925 by Sir Richard H. K. Butler, and the ceremony was attended by about 20,000 people.  Following the Second World War, the names of those who fell in that conflict were added to the memorial.
In 1987, the monument was removed for 2 months for repair work.
  In 2013 the monument was cleaned and restored.

Description

The memorial is in Portland stone with the figures and the names of those lost in Westmorland stone. It has a rectangular plan, the longer sides facing east and west. The monument is set on three steps on a paved plateau, and is flanked by flagstaffs. On the longer sides are panels containing the names of those who fell in the First World War, and on the shorter sides, in smaller panels, are those who died in the Second World War. On the shorter sides, above the panels, are carvings of female figures, one holding a wreath, the other a medallion. Above the figures and panels on all sides is a frieze of festoons of laurel. Below the panels on the long sides are circular plaques carved with crests of the forces involved in the wars. Above the figures on the short sides are the arms of Birkenhead. The top of the memorial is in the form of a sarcophagus. The total estimated cost of the memorial was £3,932.

On the east side, facing the Town Hall is an inscription reading as follows.

On the opposite long side is the following inscription.

In the medallion held by one of the figures is written:

Above the front seat ledge is inscribed:

The dates "1914–1919" are inscribed below the figures on the short sides, and above them is inscribed "1939 1945 WAR".  The names of the sculptor and architect are also on the memorial.

Appraisal

The memorial is recorded in the National Heritage List for England as a designated Grade II* listed building, having been designated on 28 March 1974.  Grade II is the middle of the three grades of listing and is applied to "particularly important buildings of more than special interest."

See also
Grade II* listed war memorials in England

Notes and references

Notes

Citations

Sources

External links
Site containing all the names on the memorial
Film of Princess Mary placing a wreath on the memorial in 1925

Buildings and structures in Birkenhead
Grade II listed buildings in Merseyside
World War I memorials in England
World War II memorials in England
Buildings and structures completed in 1925
1925 establishments in England
Grade II listed monuments and memorials